José Raimundo Arcia Orta (August 22, 1943 - July 31, 2016) was a utility infielder in Major League Baseball who played from 1968 to 1970 for the Chicago Cubs and San Diego Padres. Arcia was signed as an amateur free agent by the Houston Colt .45s in 1962 but would not make his major league debut for six years.

In 1967's Rule 5 draft, the Cubs selected Arcia from the Cardinals organization. He opened the 1968 season as a member of the Cubs and remained with the club the whole season, batting .190 in 58 games as a rookie, hitting his only Major League home run, and playing six positions in the field. Arcia was selected by the Padres in the 1968 MLB expansion draft.

Arcia saw considerable playing time over the next two seasons with San Diego, serving as a rather versatile utility man. The only positions he did not play in his career were catcher and pitcher. His poor offense continued, however, as he hit .215 and .223 in 1969 and 1970 respectively, with singles accounting for 90 of his 116 hits. He also proved to be an unreliable baserunner, caught stealing in 13 of his 30 attempts those two years, though he did lead the Padres with 14 stolen bases in 1969.

Arcia's last game as a big leaguer was September 30, 1970.

References

External links

Pelota Binaria (Venezuelan Winter League)

1943 births
2016 deaths
Arkansas Travelers players
Burlington Indians players (1958–1964)
Cardenales de Lara players
Cuban expatriate baseball players in Venezuela
Cedar Rapids Cardinals players
Chicago Cubs players
Columbus Astros players
Dubuque Packers players
Florida Instructional League Cardinals players
Grand Forks Chiefs players
Hawaii Islanders players
Jacksonville Suns players
Kansas City Royals scouts
Llaneros de Acarigua players
Major League Baseball infielders
Major League Baseball outfielders
Major League Baseball players from Cuba
Cuban expatriate baseball players in the United States
Minor league baseball managers
Modesto Colts players
Moultrie Colt .22s players
Omaha Royals players
Raleigh Cardinals players
Rock Hill Cardinals players
Salt Lake City Angels players
San Diego Padres players
Baseball players from Havana
Tacoma Twins players
Thomasville Tigers players
Tigres de Aragua players